The 1935 World Table Tennis Championships – Swaythling Cup (men's team) was the ninth edition of the men's team championship.  

Hungary won the gold medal again after defeating Czechoslovakia 5–3 in the final. A new format for the competition consisted of two groups with the group winners progressing to the final. The runner-up for both groups received a bronze medal.

Swaythling Cup tables

Group 1

+ withdrew

Group 2

+ withdrew

Final

See also
List of World Table Tennis Championships medalists

References

-